Ozark Highlands Spirits refers to a category of distilled liquor codified by the Missouri General Assembly of the U.S. State of Missouri in 2022. It was signed by the Missouri Governor on July 1, 2022, and became law on August 28, 2022.

History 

The Ozark Highlands are known for their limestone bluffs and caves that were used by the early inhabitants as shelters. These first settlers, Paleo-Indians known as Bluff Dwellers, inhabited the region as far back as 12,000 years ago. The first documentation of white settlers in the Ozark Highlands was around 1705. In 1799, Daniel Boone left Kentucky and settled within the northern edge of the Ozark Highlands, in what is today known as Defiance, Missouri.

The history of making spirits, primarily moonshine, is embedded in the history of the Ozark Highlands. In the 18th Century, Irish and Scottish immigrants settled in the region, bringing their distilling skills with them. In order to avoid taxation, distillers hid their production by creating and selling their liquor, giving birth to the name moonshine. During prohibition (1920-1933), this moonlight manufacturing actually increased and distilling became a part of the Ozarks culture.

In 2022, a group of consumers and distillers came together to discuss how to codify Ozark Highlands spirits in Missouri law. Today, more than half of the 51 distilleries in Missouri are located in the Ozark Highlands.

Geology & Topography 

The Ozark Highlands is a Level III ecoregion designated by the Environmental Protection Agency (EPA) in four U.S. states. Most of the region is within Missouri, with a part in Arkansas and small sections in Oklahoma and Kansas. It is the largest subdivision of the region known as the Ozark Mountains, less rugged in comparison to the Boston Mountains in Arkansas, the highest part of the Ozarks. The Ozarks cover a significant portion of northern Arkansas and most of the southern half of Missouri, extending from Interstate 40 in central Arkansas to Interstate 70 in central Missouri.

The Ozark Highlands ecoregion has been subdivided into eleven Level IV ecoregions, seven of which lie completely within Missouri.

Together with the Ouachita Mountains, the area is known as the U.S. Interior Highlands. It is one of nine true highland regions in the world which are distinct for their soils mineral composition and limestone base.

Legislation 

The Ozark Highlands Spirits legislation was first introduced in the Missouri House as HB 2621 on February 1, 2022. The House hearing took place on March 21 and was passed by the House Committee on General Laws on March 31, 2022.

During the final days of session in 2022, the "Ozark Highlands Spirits" language was included as a Senate amendment to HB 1738  sponsored by Representative Shamed Dogan. The legislation was passed by the Missouri Senate on May 11, 2022, and was passed by the Missouri House on May 13, 2022, the final day of the 2022 session. It was delivered to Missouri Governor Mike Parson on May 18 and was signed by the Governor on July 1.

The law came into effect on August 28, 2022, and is listed as Missouri Revised Statutes 311.028. The region described as the Ozark Highlands for the purposes of this legislation was drafted by the Missouri Department of Natural Resources, as required by the language of the legislation.

Requirements 

Under the new Missouri law, the following requirements must be followed for a distiller to label their spirit as "Ozark Highlands" and sell it in Missouri.

 Produced and bottled in the Ozark Highlands
 Aged product must be aged in barrels manufactured in Missouri
 Whiskey must be aged for a minimum of 4 years
 Uses chemical-free water from the Ozark Highlands

Certification 

Under Missouri law, any distiller wishing to produce Ozark Highlands Spirits and label them as such for sale in Missouri must have each product initially certified by the Ozark Highland Distillers Guild. The Guild is a non-profit, volunteer-run, 501(c)(3) organization.

References

External links 

Ozark Highland Distillers Guild

Distilleries in Missouri
Ozarks
Economy of Missouri
Agriculture in Missouri
Distilled drinks
Highlands